The following is a list of events relating to television in Ireland from 1980.

Events

6 January – The rural drama serial Bracken is aired. Cast members included Gabriel Byrne and Dana Wynter.
19 April – Ireland wins the 25th Eurovision Song Contest with What's Another Year? performed by Johnny Logan.
16 March – RTÉ broadcasts the historical drama series Strumpet City, based on the novel by James Plunkett is aired.
27 May – RTÉ Television broadcast an interview with a member of the Irish Republican Socialist Party (IRSP), an organisation not covered by Section 31.
9 July – RTÉ News reporter Charlie Bird makes his on camera debut.
4 October – Anything Goes, a show for young people, makes its debut. The programme is part of RTÉ's development of young people's programming.

Debuts

RTÉ 1
6 January – Bracken (1980–1982)
16 January – Strumpet City (1980)
12 April –  Matt and Jenny (1979–1980)
21 September –  The Cheryl Ladd Special: Souvenirs (1980)

Ongoing television programmes

1960s
RTÉ News: Nine O'Clock (1961–present)
RTÉ News: Six One (1962–present)
The Late Late Show (1962–present)
Quicksilver (1965–1981)
Wanderly Wagon (1967–1982)

1970s
Sports Stadium (1973–1997)
Trom agus Éadrom (1975–1985)
The Late Late Toy Show (1975–present)
RTÉ News on Two (1978–2014)
The Live Mike (1979–1982)
Bosco (1979–1996)
The Sunday Game (1979–present)

Ending this year
19 March – Hall's Pictorial Weekly (1971–1980)

Births
9 April – Jennifer Maguire, television presenter and reality show contestant
Undated – Victor Burke, actor

See also
1980 in Ireland

References

 
1980s in Irish television